TfL Rail was the concession which operated commuter services on two separate railway lines in London, England and its environs whilst the Crossrail construction project linking these lines was underway. On 24 May 2022, upon the opening of the Crossrail central section, TfL Rail was rebranded as Elizabeth line and the name was discontinued.

The branch comprised the first 14 stations on the Great Eastern Main Line, with interchange at Shenfield for medium- and long-distance services beyond to East Anglia. Services were operated by MTR Corporation under contract to Transport for London (TfL). Between May 2016 and May 2017, TfL Rail carried over 47 million passengers on the Shenfield branch.

History
In June 2013, TfL announced that Arriva, MTR Corporation, Keolis / Go-Ahead Group and National Express had been shortlisted to bid for the concession to operate Crossrail, which was under construction.

In July 2014, TfL awarded the contract to Hong Kong's MTR, for a duration of eight years with an option to extend by an additional two years.

MTR Corporation (Crossrail) was created as a new train operating company and took control of the "metro" service between London Liverpool Street and Shenfield from the previous operator, Abellio Greater Anglia, on 31 May 2015. The existing  trains were re-painted in TfL Rail livery, and appropriate branding, advertising and message boards were added at the 14 stations along the line. Every station is staffed, from the first train to the last of the day. In June 2017, Class 345 trains began running between London Liverpool Street and Shenfield.

In May 2018, TfL Rail took over operation of the Heathrow Connect service between London Paddington and Heathrow, as well as some GWR services between London Paddington and Hayes & Harlington. In December 2019, TfL Rail took over operation of the Great Western Railway stopping services between London Paddington and Reading. In November 2019, Class 345 trains began running between London Paddington and Reading, as a soft launch of the service. In July 2020, Class 345 trains began running between London Paddington and Heathrow.

The two branches became part of the Elizabeth line when the central section opened on 24 May 2022, with the current branches connecting up with the core later.

Route
The eastern branch of TfL Rail ran over the existing  of track on the Great Eastern Main Line between London Liverpool Street and Shenfield.

Stations

Former services

Shenfield branch

TfL Rail took over operations from Abellio Greater Anglia on 31 May 2015. TfL Rail subsequently introduced a fleet of new  trains. On 22 June 2017, Class 345 trains entered passenger service on the Shenfield branch.

The Class 315 trains will continue to be maintained at the existing Ilford depot, but the Class 345 trains will be maintained at Old Oak Common and Ilford depots.

Heathrow branch
TfL Rail inherited five  units from Heathrow Connect when it took over operations on 20 May 2018. These trains were used to operate the existing half-hourly (2tph) service to Heathrow. On 30 July 2020, Class 345 trains entered passenger service on the Heathrow branch. The last Class 360 trains were withdrawn in September 2020.

Reading branch 
On 26 September 2019, TfL Rail announced that it would take over the Paddington to Reading stopping services on 15 December 2019, using Class 345 trains in place of the Class 387 and Class 165 trains used by Great Western Railway. Before that, on 25 November 2019 six GWR services a day started to operate using Class 345 trains, operated by TfL, to get drivers ready and stock in place for the main 15 December switch over.

Route tables 
Prior to the opening of the Elizabeth line on 24 May 2022, the timetabled weekday off-peak service pattern consisted of:

Rolling stock

Fleet carried over to the Elizabeth line

Past fleet
Former units operated by TfL Rail include:

References

External links 

 

2015 establishments in England
Crossrail
Railway companies established in 2015
Train operating companies in the United Kingdom
Transport for London
MTR Corporation